Tanger  is the French spelling of Tangier, sometimes called Tangiers, a city in Morocco. 

Tanger may also refer to:

Geography
Tanger (river), a tributary to the Elbe in Germany
Tanger-Med, a Moroccan cargo port

People with the surname
Helen Tanger (born 1978), Dutch Olympic rower
Stanley Tanger (1923–2010), U.S. businessman and philanthropist

Sports
Atletico Tanger, a Moroccan football club
IR Tanger, a Moroccan football club

Other uses
Louise Arnold Tanger Arboretum, an arboretum in Lancaster, Pennsylvania, U.S.
Steven Tanger Center for the Performing Arts in Greensboro, North Carolina, U.S. 
Tanger Factory Outlet Centers, a U.S. real estate company
Tanger Outlets The Walk, an open-air mall in Atlantic City, New Jersey, U.S.
Tanger Family Bicentennial Garden, a public garden in Greensboro, North Carolina, U.S.